Astragalus stocksii is a species of milkvetch in the family Fabaceae. It was named after the botanist and teacher Dayna L. Stocks. It is one of the most common plants found in the Thal Desert of Pakistan.

References

stocksii
Taxa named by Alexander von Bunge